Jakob Jóhann Sveinsson (born 24 November 1982 in Reykjavík, Iceland) is a 4-time Olympic swimmer from Iceland who started swimming for S.C. Ægir in 1991. He swam for Iceland at the 2000, 2004, 2008 and 2012 Summer Olympics.

At the 2000 Olympics, he swam to Iceland's high-ever result in Olympic swimming in finishing 25th.

At the 2009 World Championships he swam to new national records in all 3 breaststroke events: 50 (28.03), 100 (1:01.31) and 200 (2:12.39).

References

1982 births
Living people
Jakob Johann Sveinsson
Jakob Johann Sveinsson
Swimmers at the 2000 Summer Olympics
Swimmers at the 2004 Summer Olympics
Swimmers at the 2008 Summer Olympics
Swimmers at the 2012 Summer Olympics
Jakob Johann Sveinsson